William Anson Barclay (born January 5, 1969) is an American politician and attorney from the State of New York. A Republican, he has served in the New York State Assembly since 2003. In January 2020, Barclay was elected to the position of Assembly Minority Leader.

Early life, education, family, and law practice
Barclay was born in Syracuse, New York. He earned his B.A. from St. Lawrence University in 1992 and his Juris Doctor from Syracuse University College of Law in 1995.  After graduating from law school he served as a clerk for Roger Miner, a judge in the United States Court of Appeals Second Circuit, in both Albany and New York City.

Barclay is a partner in the law firm of Barclay Damon. His father is Hugh Douglas Barclay, a former U.S. Ambassador to El Salvador and a former chair of the Republican Conference in the New York State Senate.

As of January 2020, Barclay and his wife Margaret reside on an 800-acre farm in Pulaski, New York. They are the parents of two sons, Harry and George. Nine generations of Barclays have resided in Pulaski.

Political career
Barclay was first elected to the State Assembly on November 5, 2002, defeating Democrat E. Clyde Ohl by a margin of 21,848 to 14,594. He took office in 2003. Barclay won the November 2008 general election with 67 percent of the vote and ran uncontested in the November 2010 and 2012 general elections. A Republican, Barclay represents the 120th District in the New York State Assembly. As of 2020, the 120th district includes Oswego, New York and portions of Onondaga, Jefferson and Oswego counties.

On December 14, 2007, Barclay announced his candidacy for New York State Senate in New York's 48th Senate district. He sought to replace former Senator Jim Wright, who stepped down. Barclay lost the election to Democratic Assemblyman Darrel Aubertine on February 27, 2008.

On January 7, 2020, Barclay was unanimously elected to the post of Assembly Minority Leader by his Republican colleagues following the resignation of Brian Kolb. He previously served as Deputy Minority Leader, as chair of the Republican Assembly Campaign Committee, and as ranking member of the Assembly Ways and Means Committee.

On August 31, 2020, during an interview with Susan Arbetter on Spectrum News' Capital Tonight, an Albany-based political insider television program, Barclay would not say if he believed in anthropogenic climate change. Barclay also claimed that natural gas "had gotten a bad rap," and said that if climate change was responsible for Hurricane Sandy, "we can't say climate change is responsible for a really cold winter."

On October 26, 2022, the Albany-based statewide environmental 501(c)(4) non-profit Environmental Advocates Action, formed in 1969 as one of the first organizations in the nation to advocate for the future of a state’s environment and the health of its citizens, released its annual Environmental Scorecard and gave Assembly Minority Leader Will Barclay its 2022 "Oil Slick Award," which symbolizes his disregard for the environment (based upon his environmental votes). His consistent anti-environmental ethos is well documented, and not "opinion." Environmental Advocates Action's sister organization is Environmental Advocates NY, which is the New York State affiliate of the National Wildlife Federation.

References 

|-

1969 births
21st-century American politicians
Lawyers from Syracuse, New York
Living people
Republican Party members of the New York State Assembly
Politicians from Syracuse, New York
St. Lawrence University alumni
Syracuse University College of Law alumni
People from Pulaski, New York